Joachim-Friedrich Martin Josef Merz (born 11 November 1955) is a German lawyer and politician, serving as Leader of the Christian Democratic Union (CDU) since 31 January 2022 and as leader of the Union parliamentary group as well as the Leader of the Opposition in the Bundestag since 15 February 2022.

Merz joined the Young Union in 1972 and is reputed to be a member of the Andean Pact, a powerful network formed by politically ambitious members of the Young Union in 1979 during a trip to the Andes. After finishing law school in 1985, he worked as a judge and corporate lawyer before entering full-time politics in 1989 when he was elected to the European Parliament. After serving one term he was elected to the Bundestag, where he established himself as the leading financial policy expert in the CDU. He was elected chairman of the CDU/CSU group in the same year as Angela Merkel was elected chairwoman of the CDU, and at the time they were chief rivals for the leadership of the party.

In 2002, he stepped down as leader of the opposition in favour of Merkel and gradually withdrew from politics, focusing on his legal career and leaving parliament entirely in 2009, until his return to parliament in 2021. In 2004 he became a senior counsel with Mayer Brown, where he has focused on mergers and acquisitions, banking and finance, and compliance. He has served on the boards of numerous companies. In 2018, he announced his return to politics. He was elected CDU leader in 2022, having failed to win the position in two previous leadership elections in 2018, and then 2021.

As a young politician in the 1970s and 1980s, he was a staunch supporter of anti-communism, the dominant state doctrine of West Germany and a core tenet of the CDU. Merz has described himself as socially conservative and economically liberal, and is seen as a representative of the traditional establishment conservative and pro-business wings of the CDU. His book Mehr Kapitalismus wagen (Venturing More Capitalism) advocates economic liberalism. He has been chairman of the Atlantik-Brücke association which promotes German-American understanding and Atlanticism, and is a staunch supporter of the European Union and NATO, having described himself as "a truly convinced European, a convinced transatlanticist". Merz advocates a closer union and "an army for Europe".

Merz is Catholic and of French Huguenot descent on his mother's side. His wife, Charlotte Merz, is a judge; they have three children. A corporate lawyer and reputed multimillionaire, he is also a licensed private pilot and owns two airplanes.

Background and early life 

Joachim-Friedrich Martin Josef Merz was born on 11 November 1955 to Joachim Merz (born 1924) and Paula Sauvigny (born 1928) in Brilon in the state of North Rhine-Westphalia in then-West Germany. His father was a judge and a member of the CDU. The Sauvigny family was a locally prominent patrician family in Brilon, of French Huguenot ancestry, and his maternal grandfather was mayor of Brilon. Friedrich Merz is Roman Catholic. Merz was raised in his mother's family home Sauvigny House in Brilon. The house was announced for sale for 2 million euros in 2021.

After finishing his Abitur exam in 1975 Merz served his military service as a soldier with a self-propelled artillery unit of the German Army. From 1976 he studied law with a scholarship from the Konrad Adenauer Foundation, first at the University of Bonn, later at the University of Marburg. After finishing law school in 1985, he became a judge in Saarbrücken. In 1986 he left his position as a judge in order to work as an in-house attorney-at-law at the German Chemical Industry Association in Bonn and Frankfurt from 1986 to 1989.

Merz speaks German, French and English.

Political career prior to 2009 
In 1972, at the age of seventeen, he became a member of the CDU's youth wing, the Young Union, and he has been described by German media as a member of the "Andean Pact," a supposed network of influential CDU members formed by members of the Young Union during a trip to the South American Andes region in 1979. He became President of the Brilon branch of the Young Union in 1980.

Member of the European Parliament, 1989–1994 
Merz successfully ran as a candidate in the 1989 European Parliament election and served one term as a Member of the European Parliament until 1994. He was a member of the Committee on Economic and Monetary Affairs and of the parliament's delegation for relations with Malta.

Member of the German Bundestag, 1994–2009 
From the 1994 German elections, he served as member of the Bundestag for his constituency, the Hochsauerland. In his first term, he was a member of the Finance Committee.

In October 1998 Merz became vice-chairman and in February 2000 Chairman of the CDU/CSU parliamentary group (alongside Michael Glos), succeeding Wolfgang Schäuble. In this capacity, he was the opposition leader in the Bundestag during Chancellor Gerhard Schröder's first term.

Ahead of the 2002 elections, Edmund Stoiber included Merz in his shadow cabinet for the Christian Democrats’ campaign to unseat incumbent Schröder as chancellor. During the campaign, Merz served as Stoiber's expert for financial markets and the national budget. After Stoiber's electoral defeat, Angela Merkel assumed the leadership of the parliamentary group; Merz again served as vice-chairman until 2004. From 2002 to 2004, he was also a member of the executive board of the CDU, again under the leadership of Merkel.

Between 2005 and 2009, Merz was a member of the Committee on Legal Affairs. In 2006, he was one of nine parliamentarians who filed a complaint at the Federal Constitutional Court against the disclosure of additional sources of income; the complaint was ultimately unsuccessful. By 2007, he announced he would not be running for political office in the 2009 elections.

Career in the private sector
Upon leaving politics, Merz worked as a corporate lawyer. Since 2004 he has been a Senior Counsel at Mayer Brown's Düsseldorf office, where he works on the corporate finance team; before 2004 he was a senior counsel with Cornelius Bartenbach Haesemann. His work as a lawyer and board member has made him a multimillionaire. He has also taken on numerous positions on corporate boards, including the following:

 Robert Bosch GmbH, Member of International Advisory Committee (since 2011)
 WEPA Hygieneprodukte GmbH, Chairman of the supervisory board (since 2009)
 Deutsche Rockwool, Member of the Supervisory Board
 Ernst & Young Germany, Member of the Advisory Board
 Odewald & Compagnie, Member of the Advisory Board 
 DBV-Winterthur Holding, Member of the Supervisory Board
 Cologne Bonn Airport, Chairman of the supervisory board (2017–2020)
 BlackRock Germany, Chairman of the supervisory board (2016–2020)
 Stadler Rail, Member of the Board of Directors (2006–2020)
 HSBC Trinkaus, chairman of the advisory board (2010–2019)
 Borussia Dortmund, Member of the supervisory board (2010–2014)      
 Axa Konzern AG, Member of the supervisory board (2007–2014)
 IVG Immobilien, Member of the supervisory board (2006–2010)
 Deutsche Börse, Member of the supervisory board (2005–2015)
 Interseroh, Member of the supervisory board (2005–2009)

Between 2010 and 2011, Merz represented the shareholders of WestLB, a publicly owned institution that had previously been Germany's third-largest lender, in talks with bidders. In 2012, he joined Norbert Röttgen’s campaign team for the North Rhine-Westphalia state election as advisor on economic policy. He served as a CDU delegate to the Federal Convention for the purpose of electing the President of Germany in 2012 and in 2017.

In November 2017, Merz was appointed by Minister-President Armin Laschet of North Rhine-Westphalia as his Commissioner for Brexit and Transatlantic Relations, an unpaid advisory position.

Return to politics
After Angela Merkel announced her intention to step down as Leader of the CDU party, Merz announced he would run in the subsequent 2018 party leadership election. His candidacy was promoted by the former CDU chairman and "crown prince" of the Kohl era, Wolfgang Schäuble (current President of the Bundestag, ranked second in federal precedence). On 7 December 2018, in the second round of the leadership election, Merz was defeated by Annegret Kramp-Karrenbauer.

On 25 February 2020, he announced his candidacy in the first 2021 CDU leadership election. His closest competitors were Armin Laschet and Norbert Röttgen. After several postponements, the election of the new CDU party president took place at the party congress on 15–16 January 2021, which was the first time in the party's history that it was held fully online. In the first round, Merz received 385 votes, 5 more than Laschet. In the second round, Merz received 466 votes out of 1001 delegates, while Laschet received 521 votes, thus failing to win the party president's post for the second time.

The same day, after losing the leadership election, Merz proposed to "join the current government and take over the Ministry for Economy". The ministry was already headed by his party colleague Peter Altmaier at the time and the proposal was rebuffed. Laschet was quick to placate Merz by recruiting him to his campaign team. Laschet justified this by saying that Merz was "without doubt a team player" and that his economic and financial expertise could provide crucial help in overcoming the huge challenge of the pandemic in a sustainable way.

Ahead of the 2021 German federal election, Patrick Sensburg, Merz's successor in his seat in the Bundestag, failed to secure his party's support for a new candidacy. Merz instead replaced him, returning to the Bundestag after a 12-year absence.

CDU chairman 

On 15 November 2021, Merz announced his candidacy in the second 2021 CDU leadership election. His opponents were Norbert Röttgen and Helge Braun.

During their short campaign, Merz's rivals positioned themselves as Merkel's heirs. Against them, Merz promised a decisive break with the centrist line Merkel had followed for 16 years.

In total, some 400 000 CDU members were able to vote online or by letter. By 17 December 2021, Merz had already won an absolute majority of 62.1 percent of the membership in the first round of voting, so a second round of voting was not necessary. This meant that at his third attempt, he managed to win the party presidency. Asked for his reaction to the results of the vote, Merz said: "Quietly I just said to myself, 'WOW'; but only quietly, the winning marching songs are far from me."

Merz was formally elected Chairman of the CDU by its 1001 congress delegates at the virtual federal party congress on 22 January 2022. In the end, 915 out of 983 delegates voted for him, winning 94.6% of the valid votes to become the leader of the largest opposition party in the Bundestag. The vote was formally a so-called "digital pre-vote", the result of which has been confirmed in writing by the delegates.

After Annegret Kramp-Karrenbauer and Armin Laschet, Merz became the third leader of the Christian Democratic Union within three years. He officially took office as party president on 31 January 2022.

Political positions
Merz has focused on economic, foreign, security, and family policies. He has described himself as socially conservative and economically liberal, and is seen as a representative of the traditional establishment conservative and pro-business wings of the CDU.

As a young politician in the 1970s and 1980s, he was a staunch supporter of anti-communism, the dominant state doctrine of West Germany and a core tenet of the CDU. His book Mehr Kapitalismus wagen advocates economic liberalism. He has been chairman of the Atlantik-Brücke association which promotes German-American understanding and Atlanticism, and is a staunch supporter of the European Union and NATO. In 2018, he described himself as "a truly convinced European, a convinced transatlanticist" and said that "I stand for a cosmopolitan Germany whose roots lie in Christian ethics and the European Enlightenment and whose most important political allies are the democracies of the West. I gladly use this expression again: The democracies of the West." He advocates a closer union and especially closer relations between Germany and France. Merz has criticized Donald Trump more harshly than Angela Merkel did and has especially criticized Trump's trade war against Europe. In 2018, he co-authored an article in defence of the European project, which among other things called for "an army for Europe."

In November 2018, Merz said that the introduction of same-sex marriage in Germany is correct. Also in 2018, Merz rejected the Ludwig Erhard Prize, citing objections to publications by the chairman of the Ludwig Erhard Foundation, Roland Tichy, considered by some to be on the extreme right. In January 2022, he said that sanctioning Russia from SWIFT over Donbas would be a mistake. Following the start of the 2022 Russian invasion of Ukraine, Merz adopted strong pro-Ukrainian and anti-Russian positions, urging Chancellor Olaf Scholz to supply Ukraine with weapons and personally travelling to Kyiv in May to meet Ukrainian President Volodymyr Zelenskyy. In 2023, Merz opposed the proposed European Union ban on internal combustion and hybrid vehicles by 2035, stating that the fight for carbon neutrality must be achieved with technology and open mindness, not bans.

Other activities (selection)
 Deutsche Nationalstiftung, Member of the Senate
 Peace of Westphalia Prize, Member of the Jury
 Bayer Foundation for German and International Labor and Business Law, Member of the Board of Trustees (1998–2002)
 KfW, Member of the supervisory board (2003–2004)
 Ludwig Erhard Foundation, Member (1998–2005)

Personal life
Friedrich Merz is married to the judge Charlotte Merz. He has three children and resides in Arnsberg in the Sauerland region. In 2005, the couple established the Friedrich und Charlotte Merz Stiftung, a foundation supporting projects in the education sector. He is a Roman Catholic.

References

External links 

Homepage
German article about his political comeback / die-wirtschaftsnews

1955 births
Living people
People from Brilon
German Roman Catholics
University of Bonn alumni
Members of the Bundestag for North Rhine-Westphalia
European amateur radio operators
German anti-communists
German people of French descent
BlackRock people
German hunters
Members of the Bundestag 2021–2025
Members of the Bundestag 2005–2009
Members of the Bundestag 2002–2005
Members of the Bundestag 1998–2002
Members of the Bundestag 1994–1998
Members of the Bundestag for the Christian Democratic Union of Germany
People associated with Mayer Brown